Amauri Alvès Horta (born 21 August 1942), known as just Amauri, is a Brazilian footballer. He played in two matches for the Brazil national football team from 1963 to 1968. He was also part of Brazil's squad for the 1963 South American Championship.

References

External links
 

1942 births
Living people
Brazilian footballers
Brazil international footballers
Association footballers not categorized by position